Marina parryi is a species of flowering plant in the legume family known by the common name Parry's false prairie-clover. It is native to the deserts of the southwestern United States and northern Mexico. This is a perennial herb producing stiff, branching stems 20 to 80 centimeters long. It is coated with glands and rough hairs. The leaves are made up of several pairs of small oval leaflets no more than 6 millimeters long. The inflorescence is a raceme of deep blue and white bicolored flowers each under a centimeter long. The fruit is a legume pod containing a single seed.

External links
 Calflora Database: Marina parryi (Parry dalea,  Parry's false prairie clover, Parry's marina)
USDA Plants Profile for Marina parryi
Jepson Manual eFlora (TJM2) treatment
UC CalPhotos gallery

Amorpheae
Flora of Northwestern Mexico
Flora of the Southwestern United States
Flora of the California desert regions
Flora of the Sonoran Deserts
Natural history of the Colorado Desert
Natural history of the Mojave Desert
Taxa named by Asa Gray
Taxa named by John Torrey
Flora without expected TNC conservation status